"To the End" is a song by English alternative rock band Blur. It appears on their third studio album, Parklife (1994), and was released as a single in May 1994. The song describes a couple unsuccessfully trying to overcome a bad patch in a relationship, and features full orchestral accompaniment with a choric refrain in French by Lætitia Sadier from Stereolab. The song was produced by Stephen Hague, unlike the rest of the Parklife album, which was produced by Stephen Street. Blur have produced several different recordings of the song.

Release

Single
"To the End" was released on 30 May 1994 as the second single from Parklife. It was not one of Blur's major hits, charting only at number 16 in the UK Singles Chart, unlike the singles released before and after, which both reached the top 10.

French version
Blur also recorded a version in which Albarn sings the lead vocal in French. This was released as the third track on the 12" and CD2 editions of the "Parklife" single. This version features a relatively straightforward French translation of the lyrics and has a slightly demo-ish sound.

To the End (La Comedie)
In March 1995, Blur re-recorded "To the End" at Abbey Road Studios with French singer Françoise Hardy, with verses sung in French. The recording mutated into a duet titled "To the End (La Comedie)". This recording was released as a single in France and included in the Brit Pop Box Set along with other Parklife-era singles. It was also released as a B-side to the single "Country House" and on French editions of the album The Great Escape.

Video
The promo video for "To the End" was directed by David Mould and shot in National Museum (Prague) and footage from the garden of Castle Libochovice in 1994. In keeping with the song's use of French, the video is a pastiche of the classic French New Wave film Last Year at Marienbad (1961). The four-minute video imitates the cinematography and editing style of the film, and replicates numerous scenes from it. Enigmatic subtitles (not from the film) appear. The band takes the place of the characters from the film: Damon Albarn plays "X" and Graham Coxon is "M", both of whom are involved in a love triangle with a mysterious woman. The video was released on the VHS and DVD editions of Blur: The Best of.

Popularity
The song was played for the series 1 finale of Channel 4 comedy-drama Misfits.

Track listings
All music was composed by Damon Albarn, Graham Coxon, Alex James, and Dave Rowntree. All lyrics were written by Albarn.

CD1
 "To the End" – 3:52
 "Threadneedle Street" – 3:19
 "Got Yer!" – 1:48

CD2 and 12-inch
 "To the End" – 3:52
 "Girls & Boys" (Pet Shop Boys 7" Mix) – 4:04
 "Girls & Boys" (Pet Shop Boys 12" Mix) – 7:16

Cassette
 "To the End" – 3:52
 "Girls & Boys" (Pet Shop Boys 7" Mix) – 4:04
 "Threadneedle Street" – 3:19

CD – Blur et Françoise Hardy – "To the End (La Comedie)" (1995)
 "To the End (La Comedie)" – 5:03
 "To the End (La Comedie)" (Instrumental) – 5:03

Personnel
 Damon Albarn – vocals, synthesizers, vibraphone
 Lætitia Sadier – vocals
 Françoise Hardy – vocals (La Comedie)
 Graham Coxon – clarinet, electric guitar
 Alex James – bass guitar
 Dave Rowntree – drums
 Stephen Hague – accordion

Charts

References

1990s ballads
1994 singles
1994 songs
Blur (band) songs
Number-one singles in Israel
Food Records singles
Rock ballads
Songs written by Damon Albarn
Songs written by Graham Coxon
Songs written by Alex James (musician)
Songs written by Dave Rowntree
Song recordings produced by Stephen Hague